Tyronne Darnell Green (born April 6, 1986) is a former American football guard. Greene was born in Pensacola, Florida and attended Woodham High School where he played both football and basketball. He played college football at Auburn. He was drafted by the San Diego Chargers in the fourth round of the 2009 NFL Draft.

Professional career

San Diego Chargers
Green was selected by the San Diego Chargers with the 133rd overall pick in the 2009 NFL Draft.

New England Patriots
Green signed with the New England Patriots on July 25, 2013.

Dallas Cowboys
Green was signed by the Dallas Cowboys on May 27, 2014. A month later the Cowboys placed him on injured reserve, but was later released with an injury settlement.

Carolina Panthers
Green was signed to a futures contract by the Carolina Panthers on December 31, 2014.

On February 7, 2016, Green's Panthers played in Super Bowl 50. In the game, the Panthers fell to the Denver Broncos by a score of 24–10.

Personal life
Green is the first cousin of tight end Ladarius Green, who played for the Pittsburgh Steelers. The two played together for San Diego Chargers for one season in 2012.

References

External links
Auburn Tigers bio
New England Patriots bio
San Diego Chargers bio

1986 births
Living people
Players of American football from Pensacola, Florida
American football offensive guards
Auburn Tigers football players
San Diego Chargers players
New England Patriots players
Dallas Cowboys players
Carolina Panthers players